Parkeisenbahn may refer to one of several park railways in German speaking countries:

 Berliner Parkeisenbahn
 Dresdner Parkeisenbahn
 Leipziger Parkeisenbahn (also known as the Parkeisenbahn Auensee)
 Parkeisenbahn Chemnitz
 Parkeisenbahn Cottbus
 Parkeisenbahn Halle
 Parkeisenbahn Plauen